Gmina Niemcza is an urban-rural gmina (administrative district) in Dzierżoniów County, Lower Silesian Voivodeship, in south-western Poland.

Neighbouring gminas
Gmina Niemcza is bordered by the town of Piława Górna and the gminas of Ciepłowody, Dzierżoniów, Kondratowice, Łagiewniki and Ząbkowice Śląskie.

Villages
Apart from the town of Niemcza, the gmina contains the villages of Chwalęcin, Gilów, Gola Dzierżoniowska, Kietlin, Ligota Mała, Nowa Wieś Niemczańska, Podlesie, Przerzeczyn-Zdrój, Ruszkowice, Wilków Wielki and Wojsławice.

Twin towns – sister cities

Gmina Niemcza is twinned with:
 Gladenbach, Germany
 Letohrad, Czech Republic
 Monteux, France

References

Niemcza
Dzierżoniów County